This is a list of events held and scheduled by the Absolute Championship Akhmat (ACA), a mixed martial arts promotion based in Russia.

Mixed martial arts

Kickboxing

Brazilian jiu-jitsu

Notes

References

Absolute Championship Akhmat
Absolute Championship Akhmat